Neodeightonia phoenicum is a plant pathogen.

References

External links 
USDA ARS Fungal Database

Fungal plant pathogens and diseases
Botryosphaeriales
Fungi described in 1890